Visiting Professors at Gresham College, Holborn, London, give free educational lectures to the general public. The college was founded for this purpose in 1597, when it appointed seven professors; this has since increased to eight and plus the Visiting Professors.

The first visiting professors were appointed in 2000.

Notes

References
 

Professorships at Gresham College
2000 establishments in England
2000 in London